Bonneviellidae is a family of cnidarians belonging to the order Leptomedusae. The family consists of only one genus: Bonneviella Broch, 1909.

References

Leptothecata
Monogeneric cnidarian families